Jacinta Athieno Ayo is a Ugandan politician and member of the parliament. She was elected as a woman Member of Parliament to represent Tororo district during the 2021 Uganda general elections after defeating Sarah Achieng Opendi.

She contested as an Independent Political member.

See also 
 List of members of the eleventh Parliament of Uganda
Independent Politician
Sarah Achieng Opendi
Member of Parliament
Parliament of Uganda

References

External links 

 Website of the Parliament of Uganda

Members of the Parliament of Uganda
Women members of the Parliament of Uganda
21st-century Ugandan women politicians
21st-century Ugandan politicians
Living people
Tororo District
Year of birth missing (living people)